Megersa is a surname. Notable people with the surname include:

Asrat Megersa (born 1987), Ethiopian footballer
Lemma Megersa (born 1970), Ethiopian politician
Metiku Megersa (born 1973), Ethiopian middle-distance runner

Surnames of African origin